Sarah Elizabeth Riske McGlamery (born June 27, 1981) is an American former professional tennis player.

Growing up in Pennsylvania, Riske attended Peters Township High School and won two PIAA state singles championships. She won a national U-18 grass court championship and was a four-time All-American for Vanderbilt University. On the professional tour she attained best rankings of 372 in singles and 213 in doubles.

Riske now lives in Nashville and is married to Todd McGlamery. She is the elder sister of WTA Tour player Alison Riske, who she both mentored and coached. Her brother-in-law, Stephen Amritraj, was also a tennis player.

ITF Circuit finals

Singles: 3 (1–2)

Doubles: 10 (4–6)

References

External links
 
 

1981 births
Living people
American female tennis players
Tennis people from Pennsylvania
People from Washington County, Pennsylvania
Vanderbilt Commodores women's tennis players